The Utah Olympic Oval is an indoor speed skating oval located  southwest of Salt Lake City, in Kearns, Utah. The Oval was built for the 2002 Winter Olympics and it hosted the long track speed skating events for the 2002 games. Inside the facility the 400 meter skating track surrounds two international sized ice sheets, and is itself surrounded by a 442 meter running track. Due to its high altitude, and the associated low air resistance, ten Olympic records and nine world records were set at the Oval during the 2002 games, the largest number of world records ever set at one event.

History
Along with Soldier Hollow and the Utah Olympic Park, the Utah Olympic Oval was built specifically for the 2002 Winter Olympics. On October 5, 1992, the Utah Sports Authority chose the Oquirrh Park Fitness Center in Kearns as the site for the 2002 Olympic Oval, beating out other locations in West Valley City, Sandy and downtown Salt Lake City. Funds from the 1989 Olympic referendum would be used to construct the oval, and would be repaid with profits from the games. The plans called for using $3.7 million of tax payer money to construct the oval, which would be an outdoor facility. If Salt Lake City won its 1995 bid for the 2002 games, Olympic funds would be used to cover the oval, and build an ice sheet in the center of the track. By the time the groundbreaking ceremony was held in May 1994, the price tag had increased to $4.1 million, with an expected completion date sometime that December. Because of cold temperatures and a wet spring, cement for the oval could not be poured, and the oval didn't open until September 1, 1995, almost a year behind schedule. The oval was formally dedicated in a ceremony, attended by Olympian Cathy Turner, on January 12, 1996. Prior to it being covered and used during the Olympic games, the oval would be used for inline skating during the summer and ice skating during the winter months.

After Salt Lake City won the 2002 Olympic bid on June 16, 1995, Salt Lake Organizing Committee (SLOC) began the design process for a permanent cover for the oval. During the cover's design process it was decided to pull up and replace the entire original oval. The new oval was designed by Gilles Stransky Brems Smith of Salt Lake City, and constructed by Layton Construction. Work on the new oval began in June 1999 at an estimated cost of $27 million. To keep those costs down, and give an unobstructed view of the ice, the roof would be constructed similar to a suspension bridge.

On April 19, 2000, as construction was progressing on the oval, some of the bolts holding the roof's cables sheared, causing part of the roof to collapse. Following an investigation into the cause of the accident and repairs, construction resumed in July 2000. Construction on the oval was further delayed when three weeks after the concrete floor was poured, the freeze tubes in numerous spots were found to have moved off their rebar supports and had floated out of alignment. It was determined that entire floor was going to have to be torn up and replaced, or else the ice might not freeze evenly. After a new floor was poured, and had cured, the final coat of ice was added to the track on February 12, 2001; just in time for four Olympic speed skaters to test out the new venue later that afternoon. The first event held in the new oval was the World Single Distance Championships, on March 9–11, 2001. On March 9, 2001, the first day of competitions, a press briefing to introduce the facility was held. Members of SLOC with the design and construction teams were present to introduce the oval to the public.

The completed facility contained the 400-meter oval skating track, which surrounded two international size hockey ice sheets. In the end the oval ended up costing $30 million, and on his blog, ex-SLOC CEO and politician, Mitt Romney states that the Utah Olympic Oval was 10 percent the cost of the Richmond Olympic Oval used during the 2010 Winter Olympics.

2002 Winter Olympics
During the 2002 games the oval hosted the speed skating events. For the competitions temporary seating was installed and the oval had a capacity for about 5,200 spectators, plus press members. 100 percent of available tickets for the venue's events were sold, allowing 53,056 spectators to witness events in the oval.

The Oval today
Following the 2002 Olympics, SLOC turned ownership of the oval over to the Utah Athletic Foundation, who also owns and manages the Utah Olympic Park near Park City. The oval currently houses the original 400-meter oval skating track, two international size ice sheets, a 442-meter running track, an eight-lane 110-meter sprint running track, weight room, locker facilities and team rooms, meeting rooms, a concession, gifts and gear shop, plus skate rentals. Skating lessons are also offered by the foundation. The U.S. Olympic Speedskating Team is currently headquartered in the oval, and has been since January 2001. The Oval is also home to the North Utah Grizzlies special needs hockey team.

Records set at the Utah Olympic Oval
The oval is one of the world's fastest indoor skating tracks, mainly because of its elevation. Because of the elevation, there is less air resistance for the skaters and less oxygen frozen into the ice, making it harder, denser and faster.

During the 2002 Olympic games all ten speed skating events held in the oval set Olympic records. The oval still maintains six, thanks in part to the relatively low elevation of the 2006, 2010, and 2014 Olympic Ovals. Before and after the Olympics, the oval has hosted many local and international speed skating competitions. Holding the honor of Fastest Ice on Earth has created an unofficial rivalry between the Utah Olympic Oval and the Calgary Olympic Oval, although the Utah oval holds 11 world records and Calgary only 1.

Long track records

Short track records

See also
 List of world records in speed skating
 List of Olympic records in speed skating

References

External links

 
  - Utah Office of Tourism - Olympic Oval
  - ISU Statistics

Venues of the 2002 Winter Olympics
Olympic speed skating venues
Indoor speed skating venues
Speed skating venues in the United States
Sports venues in Salt Lake County, Utah
Sports venues in Utah
Sports venues completed in 2001
2001 establishments in Utah